The Montenegro national under-21 football team is the national under-21 football team of Montenegro and is controlled by the Football Association of Montenegro.  The team competes in the European Under-21 Football Championship, held every two years.

Competitive record

UEFA European Under-21 Championship Record

2021 UEFA European Under-21 Football Championship qualification

Recent results

Players

Current squad
 The following players were called up for the friendly matches.
 Match dates: 17 and 20 November 2022
 Opposition:  and 
Caps and goals correct as of: 26 September 2022, after the match against .

Recent call-ups

See also
Montenegro national football team
Montenegro national under-19 football team
Montenegro national under-17 football team

References

External links
 Football Association of Montenegro (Montenegrin)
 JadranSport.org - South-Eastern European football news coverage 
 UEFA.com (Montenegro) 

 
European national under-21 association football teams